Sö 139 is a Viking Age runestone in granite inscribed in Old Norse with the Younger Futhark runic alphabet. It is located 3.5 m east-north-east of Sö 140 along the road between Lid and Aspa in Ludgo parish, in Nyköping Municipality, in Södermanland. Both stones are placed at the southern side of the road next to the brook at Korpbro. It is 1.48 m tall and 1.36 m wide. The style is tentatively categorized as Pr3.  It is unusual because it was raised in memory of a woman.

Inscription

Transliteration
stain : lit × raisa stain × þ... ... × esiþi × frinkunu × sina × kristr : liti : anta + ...(a)ʀ : kunuʀ koþraʀ k-...-...-- · [a](u)k : fiþr [·] þiʀ + ristu × ru

Transcription
Stæinn let ræisa stæin þ[annsi at](?) Æshæiði, frændkunu sina. Kristr letti anda [henn]aʀ(?), kunuʀ goðraʀ. ... ok Fiðr þæiʀ ristu runaʀ.

Translation
"Steinn had this stone raised in memory of(?) Ásheiðr, his kinswoman. May Christ relieve her spirit, the good wife. ... and Finnr, they carved the runes."

Notes

Sources 
 Scandinavian Runic-text Database, Sö 139
 Elias Wessén, Erik Brate. Sveriges runinskrifter. Bd 3, Södermanlands runinskrifter. 1924–1936. Kungliga Vitterhets Historie och Antikvitets Akademien. Stockholm. 

Runestones in Södermanland
Runestones raised in memory of women